Ernest Lee Major (1864–1950) was an American painter.

Early life and education 
Originally from the Washington DC area, Major first studied under E. C. Messer at the Corcoran Gallery of Art, then at the Art Students League of New York with William Merritt Chase. A Harper Hargarten Prize provided him with the opportunity to travel to Europe, where he studied under Gustave Boulanger and Jules Joseph Lefebvre.

Career 
Returning to the United States in 1888, Major taught at Cowles Art School until he took a teaching post in 1896 at Massachusetts Normal Art School. From 1908, he moved to Fenway Studios where he taught private lessons and painted.

Major's work won a silver medal at the Panama–Pacific International Exposition in 1915, and also the Bok Prize in 1917.

Upon Major's death, the Vose Galleries displayed his works in a memorial exhibit.

References

Further reading 
 
 

1864 births
1950 deaths
19th-century American painters
People from Washington, D.C.
Art Students League of New York alumni
20th-century American painters